Sinne Eeg (born 1 September 1977 in Lemvig, Denmark) is a Danish jazz vocalist and composer.

Eeg has received a number of recognitions and positive reviews both nationally and internationally, and is considered among the best female jazz vocalists currently in Scandinavia. She has composed many of her own songs, and although she usually sings in English, she has also performed and recorded songs in Danish.

Eeg has won the Danish Music Awards prize in the category Best Danish Vocal Jazz Album of the Year four times: in 2007, 2010, 2014 and 2015, for her albums Waiting for Dawn, Don't Be So Blue, Face the Music, and Eeg - Fonnesbæk. She also received the Ben Webster Prize in 2014. The Webster Foundation describes her as "a true jazz singer, who both shows sensitivity, improvisational skills, maturity, broad range and timing in her singing."

Background 
Eeg was admitted at the Academy of Music in Esbjerg in 1997; she graduated in 2003. As part of her musical studies she has studied with American singer Janet Lawson in New York City.

Eeg has toured Europe, Japan, China and the United States. On 26 January 2012 she sang in Brussels accompanied by the Danish Radio Big Band at the celebration for the beginning of the Danish Presidency of the Council of the European Union. In Denmark she regularly performs at the jazz venue of La Fontaine in Copenhagen.

Discography

Albums

Collaborations

Compilations

Awards 
Amongst Eegs most notable awards are:

 2007: Vocal Jazz Album of the Year, Danish Music Awards
 2010: Vocal Jazz Album of the Year, Danish Music Awards
 2014: Vocal Jazz Album of the Year, Danish Music Awards
 2014: Ben Webster Prize
 2014: Prix du Jazz Vocal, Académie du Jazz, Face the Music
 2015: Vocal Jazz Album of the Year, Danish Music Awards
 2016: The Queen Ingrid Honorary Grant

References

External links 
 
MySpace

1977 births
Living people
People from Lemvig
21st-century Danish  women singers
EMI Records artists
ArtistShare artists